The 2007 TAC Cup season was the 16th season of the TAC Cup competition. Calder Cannons have won their fourth premiership title after defeating the Murray Bushrangers in the grand final by 50 points.

Ladder

Grand final

References 

NAB League
Nab League